Charles Michels is a station on Line 10 of the Paris Métro. It is located in the 15th arrondissement.

History
The station opened as Beaugrenelle on 13 July 1913 as part of the initial section of line 8 as its temporary southern terminus, and with Opéra as its northern terminus. The line was then extended to Porte d'Auteuil on 30 September that same year, becoming its new southern terminus. It was then named after Place Beaugrenelle (now known as Place Charles Michels). Beaugrenelle ("beautiful Grenelle") was a name given by property developers in the Grenelle district during its urbanisation. 

On 27 July 1937, the section of line 8 between La Motte-Picquet–Grenelle and Porte d'Auteuil, including Beaugrenelle, was transferred to line 10 during the reconfiguration of lines 8, 10, and the old line 14. On 29 July 1937, line 10 was extended from Duroc to La Motte-Picquet–Grenelle. 

On 14 July 1945, both the station as well as the nearby Place Beaugrenelle were renamed Charles Michels and Place Charles Michels respectfully, in honour of Charles Michels (1903-1941), a trade unionist, communist militant, and deputy of the 15th arrondissement in Paris. He was held hostage and shot during the Occupation by the Nazis in retaliation for the assassination of Karl Hotz, amongst 44 other people. Hence, the station, along with 7 other stations, were renamed after the Second World War to honour the resistance fighters who had died for France. The other stations were: Colonel Fabien, Corentin Cariou, Corentin Celton, Guy Môquet, Jacques Bonsergent, Marx Dormoy, and Trinité - d'Estienne d'Orves.

As part of the "Renouveau du métro" programme by the RATP, the station's platforms were renovated and modernised in 2009.

In 2019, the station was used by 4,601,730 passengers, making it the 93rd busiest of the Métro network out of 302 stations.

In 2020, the station was used by 2,198,392 passengers amidst the COVID-19 pandemic, making it the 194th busiest of the Métro network out of 108 stations.

In 2021, the station was used by 3,079,569 passengers, making it the 102nd busiest of the Métro network out of 305 stations.

Passenger services

Access
The station has 2 accesses:

 Access 1: Place Charles-Michels
 Access 2: rue des Entrepreneurs

Station layout

Platforms
The station has a standard configuration with 2 tracks surrounded by 2 side platforms.

Other connections
The station is also served by lines 42, 70, and 88 of the RATP bus network, and at night, by lines N12 and N61 bus of the Noctilien network.

Nearby
A replica of the Statue of Liberty on the Île aux Cygnes.
Beaugrenelle shopping mall
Front de Seine
square Pau-Casals

Gallery

References

Paris Métro stations in the 15th arrondissement of Paris
Railway stations in France opened in 1913
Paris Métro line 10